The Sacred Heart Convent School is a private, Catholic college preparatory school in Khlong Toei District, Bangkok, Thailand. It is a private school that is located in the center of downtown Bangkok. It is an all-girls school.

The school was established on 28 February 1934 and was officially approved on 10 January 1937. It  initially offered Grades 1 to 4. In 1975, the school opened a kindergarten program and used a 2-storey wooden building as a classroom. In 2002, The English Program (EP) was introduced.

History 
Sr.Séraphine de Marie Luttenbacher, SPC (née: Eugénie Luttenbacher) is a religious nun of Sisters of Saint Paul of Chartres. She is from Alsace, France. As a religious nun, she was assigned by her congregation to Saigon, Vietnam. She was transferred to Siam to be the rector of Saint Louis Hospital, Bangkok and then She was appointed as rector of the religious sisters assigned to the St. Francis-Xavier Catholic Church, Samsen in 1903.

In 1924, René-Marie-Joseph Perros (Apostolic Vicar to Bangkok) was convincing the religious sisters assigned to the St. Francis-Xavier Catholic Church, Samsen to join the Congregation of the Sisters of Sacred Heart of Jesus of Bangkok and he appointed Sr.Seraphine de Marie Lutenbraker as rector.

In 1934, Sr.Séraphine de Marie Luttenbacher opened the first school of the Sisters of the Sacred Heart of Jesus of Bangkok and named it "Couvent de Sacré Coeur".

During the early days of this school, it used a Thai and French name and used Thai and French language as the medium of instruction in school but now has changed French to English.

School symbol
"H" comes from 8H which stand for Heart, Holy, Honest, Honor, Humble, Hospitality, Hope, and Home. H is supported by branches. The green leaves represent the people while the limb is the society which are dependent on one another. H in the circle means that it is the center of the Congregation of the Sacred Hearts of Jesus in Bangkok that unites the administrators, teachers, and students.

School colors
Red and white are the school colors which symbolize love of humanity, following the example of Jesus. Red represents love which mirrors the love of Jesus. White represents purity, optimism, benevolence, absolution, and goodwill towards others.

At present
Sacred Heart Convent School has three sections: Kindergarten (3–5 years old), Primary (grades 1–6) and high school (grades 7–12). The Active Conversation English Program (ACE) studies English with IDEAL teachers two hours a week. It provides for kindergarten and primary sections. The Intensive Program (IP) studies English with IDEAL teachers five hours a week. It provides for primary and high school sections. The ASEAN Program (AP) studies English with IDEAL teachers two hours a week and Chinese two hours a week. It provides for primary and junior high school (grades 7–9) sections. The English Program (EP) provides teaching and learning in English in all subjects except Thai and social science with IDEAL teachers. It provides for all sections.

Facts
School Address: 
94 Sunthornkosa Road, Klongtoey, Bangkok 10110 Thailand
School Abbreviation: 
S.H.C.
Type of School:
 Private Girls' School
School Motto: 
Honest, Kind, Knowledgeable, Love and Honor Integrity
Director: 
Sister Dr. Patchara Nantajinda
Grades:
 1- 12

Campuses
Phraharuthai Nontaburi School
Phraharuthai Donmuang School
Phraharuthai Sawankhalok School
Phraharuthai Patthanaves School

Alumnus
Rhatha Phongam: singer, actress
Chanidapa Pongsilpipat: actress, model
Ungsumalynn Sirapatsakmetha: actress
Jarinporn Joonkiat: actress
Nathathai Saengphech: singer

References

"SHC History", Sacred Heart Convent School website, retrieved October 22, 2013

External links

Sacred Heart Convent School (Bangkok)-Jesus 

Catholic schools in Thailand
Schools in Bangkok
Educational institutions established in 1934
1934 establishments in Siam
Khlong Toei district